Hyalopatina is a genus of very small sea snails or limpets, marine gastropod mollusks in the subfamily Phenacolepadinae  of the family Phenacolepadidae.

Species
 Hyalopatina nakamigawai (Is. Taki, 1954)
 Hyalopatina planata (Habe, 1951)
 Hyalopatina rushii (Dall, 1889)

References

External links
 Dall, W. H. (1889). Reports on the results of dredging, under the supervision of Alexander Agassiz, in the Gulf of Mexico (1877-78) and in the Caribbean Sea (1879-80), by the U.S. Coast Survey Steamer "Blake", Lieut.-Commander C.D. Sigsbee, U.S.N., and Commander J.R. Bartlett, U.S.N., commanding. XXIX. Report on the Mollusca. Part 2, Gastropoda and Scaphopoda. Bulletin of the Museum of Comparative Zoölogy at Harvard College. 18: 1-492, pls. 10-40.
 Fukumori H., Yahagi T., Warén A. & Kano Y. (2019). Amended generic classification of the marine gastropod family Phenacolepadidae: transitions from snails to limpets and shallow-water to deep-sea hydrothermal vents and cold seeps. Zoological Journal of the Linnean Society. 185(3): 636-655.

Phenacolepadidae